In the geometry of hyperbolic 3-space, the cubic-icosahedral honeycomb is a compact uniform honeycomb, constructed from icosahedron, cube, and cuboctahedron cells, in an icosidodecahedron vertex figure. It has a single-ring Coxeter diagram, and is named by its two regular cells.

Images

See also 
 Convex uniform honeycombs in hyperbolic space
 List of regular polytopes

References 
Coxeter, Regular Polytopes, 3rd. ed., Dover Publications, 1973. . (Tables I and II: Regular polytopes and honeycombs, pp. 294–296)
Coxeter, The Beauty of Geometry: Twelve Essays, Dover Publications, 1999  (Chapter 10: Regular honeycombs in hyperbolic space, Summary tables II,III,IV,V, p212-213)
 Jeffrey R. Weeks The Shape of Space, 2nd edition  (Chapter 16-17: Geometries on Three-manifolds I,II)
 Norman Johnson Uniform Polytopes, Manuscript
 N.W. Johnson: The Theory of Uniform Polytopes and Honeycombs, Ph.D. Dissertation, University of Toronto, 1966 
 N.W. Johnson: Geometries and Transformations, (2018) Chapter 13: Hyperbolic Coxeter groups

Honeycombs (geometry)